Radogoshch is a rural locality (a selo) in Komarichsky District, Bryansk Oblast, Russia. The population was 438 as of 2010. There are 3 streets.

Geography 
Radogoshch is located 12 km north of Komarichi (the district's administrative centre) by road. Kokino is the nearest rural locality.

References 

Rural localities in Komarichsky District
Sevsky Uyezd